Hendrik Van Crombrugge (born 30 April 1993) is a Belgian professional footballer who plays as a goalkeeper for Belgian Pro League club Anderlecht and the Belgium national team.

Club career
Hendrik Van Crombrugge started his career with Standard de Liège. On 1 August 2019 it was announced that Van Crombrugge had signed a 4 year contract at Anderlecht.

International career
Van Crombrugge earned his first full international call up when Roberto Martínez named him in the Belgium squad in September 2019. Van Crombrugge debuted with Belgium in a 1–1 friendly draw with Ivory Coast on 8 October 2020.

Career statistics

Notes

References

External links
 
 
 

1993 births
Living people
Footballers from Flemish Brabant
Belgian footballers
Belgium youth international footballers
Belgium international footballers
Standard Liège players
Sint-Truidense V.V. players
K.A.S. Eupen players
R.S.C. Anderlecht players
Belgian Pro League players
Challenger Pro League players
Association football goalkeepers
Sportspeople from Leuven